Halmus is a genus of beetle of the family Coccinellidae.

Species
 Halmus chalybeus  (Boisduval, 1835) - Steel-blue Ladybird 
 Halmus coelestris  (Blackburn, 1891) 
 Halmus cupripennis  Weise, 1923 
 Halmus evelynensis  (Weise, 1923) 
 Halmus hilli  Ślipiński et Giorgi, 2006 
 Halmus viridis  Ślipiński et Giorgi, 2006

References
 

Coccinellidae genera
Taxa named by Étienne Mulsant